Hugh Cairns Alexander Back (20 August 1863 – 27 December 1928) was Archdeacon of Warwick from 1923 until his death.

Back was educated at Trinity College, Cambridge and ordained Deacon in 1887; and Priest in 1888.  His began his career with curacies at Ulverston and Kidderminster. He was Rector of Brandiston from 1892 to 1897; Vicar of Rostherne from 1897 to 1903; Rector of Berkswell from 1903 to 1924; and  Rector of Hampton Lucy from 1924 until his death.

References

1863 births
1928 deaths
Alumni of Trinity College, Cambridge
19th-century English Anglican priests
20th-century English Anglican priests
Archdeacons of Warwick